Pseudocolaspis metallica is a species of leaf beetle of the Democratic Republic of the Congo and Senegal, described by François-Louis Laporte in 1833.

References

Eumolpinae
Beetles of the Democratic Republic of the Congo
Taxa named by François-Louis Laporte, comte de Castelnau
Beetles described in 1833
Insects of West Africa